Monsieur is an honorific title.

Monsieur may also refer to:

Monsieur (novel), a novel by Lawrence Durrell
"Monsieur" (song), a song from the Eurovision Song Contest 1989
Monsieur, a 1962 song by Petula Clark
Monsieur (1911 film), a silent short romantic drama film
Monsieur (1964 film), a comedy film
Monsieur (1990 film), a film directed by Jean-Philippe Toussaint
Monsieur Chouchani, an anonymous rabbi